Clytie sancta is a moth of the family Erebidae first described by Otto Staudinger in 1898. It is found in the deserts of North Africa, from the central parts of the Sahara to the Arabian Peninsula.

There are multiple generations per year. Adults are on wing year round.

The larvae feed on Tamarix species.

External links

Image

Ophiusina
Moths described in 1898
Insects of Chad
Insects of Ethiopia
Lepidoptera of West Africa
Moths of the Middle East
Moths of Africa